Yael Neeman (born 1960), is an Israeli author.

Biography 

Yael Neeman was born in Kibbutz Yehiam. In the early eighties she moved to Tel Aviv. She studied for her master's degree in Hebrew Literature and Philosophy at Tel Aviv University.

She worked as a literary editor in Israeli publishing houses and in the late 1990s started to write her own works.

In addition to her 5 novels, she has been published in newspapers and literary journals in Israel and abroad. Her play (written with Amir Rotem) was performed in Beit Lessin Theatre in 2006.

In 2011 she published her third book "We Were The Future" (Hayinu He’atid) with Ahuzat Bait Publishing House, which describes her childhood and adolescence in Kibbutz, Yehiam.  The book was on the bestseller lists for many months, including no. 1 for several weeks.  That same year, Neeman won The Book Publishers Association of Israel's Golden Book Award for having sold more than 20,000 copies, and was nominated for the prestigious Sapir Prize for Literature.   The Polish version has been published under the name Byliśmy przyszłością (in September 2012) by the publisher Wydawnictwo Czarne. The book also won a special grant from The Rabinovich Foundation to be translated into English by Sondra Silverston. The book was published in English in the United States in September, 2016 by Overlook Abrams. The French version is being published by Actes Sud in April 2015 under the name "Nous étions l’avenir".

In August 2013 Neeman's fourth book, a selection of short stories entitled "The Option" (Ktovet Aish), was published by Keter Publishing House. The book  readers and remained on the bestseller list for several weeks.

"The Option" was nominated for the Sapir Prize for Literature for 2014.

Neeman was awarded the Prime Minister's Prize for Hebrew Writers for 2015.

In 2015, she participated in the International Writing Program's Fall Residency at the University of Iowa in Iowa City, IA.

In May 2018 her book "There Was a Woman" was published by Ahuzat Bait Publishing House, and was shortlisted for the Sapir Prize for Literature, 2019, and it was on the bestseller lists for several months. The book won The Book Publishers Association of Israel's Golden Book Award for having sold more than 20,000 copies.

Works in Hebrew 
"Orange Tuesday" Am Oved Publishing House, Tel Aviv 1998
"Rumors About Love" Katom Publishing House, Tel Aviv 2004
"We Were The Future" Ahuzat Bait Publishing House, 2011
"The Option", Keter Publishing House, 2013
"There Was a Woman" Ahuzat Bait Publishing House, 2018

Translations 
Byliśmy przyszłością Wydawnictwo Czarne, Wolowiec 2012
Nous étions l’avenir Actes Sud, 2015
We Were The Future - A Memoir of the Kibbutz, New York - London, 2016

References

External links 
Review in Haaretz newspaper (in English).
Reviews and links about "We Were the Future" in Ahuzat Bayit's website
Yael Neeman's entry in The Lexicon of Hebrew Literature
Hebrew E-book Writer of the Month - EVRIT
Article by Yithak Laor about "We Were The Future" in Haaretz - 21 January 2011
Audio Book by iCast
Yael Neeman reading from "We Were The Future" in Hebrew
Review of "We Were the Future" in Financial Times.
Review of "We Were the Future" in Kirkus Review.
Review of "We Were the Future" in The Jewish Book Council.

1960 births
Living people
Israeli writers
Tel Aviv University alumni
International Writing Program alumni
Recipients of Prime Minister's Prize for Hebrew Literary Works